Cannonball Run II is a 1984 action comedy film starring Burt Reynolds and an all-star cast, released by Warner Bros. and Golden Harvest. Like the original Cannonball Run, it is set around an illegal cross-country race.

This was the last of the "formula" comedies for Reynolds. It also marked the final feature film appearances of Dean Martin and Frank Sinatra. Their appearances, coupled with those of Sammy Davis Jr. and Shirley MacLaine, marked the final on-screen appearance of the Rat Pack team. The film also marked the final film appearance of Jim Nabors before his death in November 2017. The film also featured Jackie Chan in his third Hollywood role.

Plot
Having lost the first Cannonball Run race, Sheik Abdul ben Falafel is ordered by his father, the King, to go back to America and win another Cannonball Run in order to "emblazon the Falafel name as the fastest in the world". When Sheik Abdul points out that there is no Cannonball Run that year, his father simply tells him to "buy one".

To make sure his "Royal Ulcer" does not prevent him from winning, the Sheik hires Doctor Nikolas Van Helsing, who teamed with J.J. McClure and Victor Prinzi in the first race as his in-car physician. Most of the participants from the first race are lured back, including J.J. and Victor, who have taken jobs working with a flying stunt crew.

Meanwhile, Blake and Fenderbaum are in financial trouble with Don Don Canneloni, who in turn is in similar financial trouble with mob enforcer Hymie Kaplan. After the Sheik manages to bail out Blake and Fenderbaum by handing one of Don Don's thugs a stack of cash, Don Don hatches a plot to kidnap the Sheik in an attempt to extort money from him.

The race begins with J.J. and Victor dressed as a US Army general and his driver, a private. They catch the attention of Betty and Veronica, who are dressed as nuns for a musical, but remain in character and hitch a ride with J.J. and Victor when they think the guys could become overnight millionaires. They do not lose their habits until later.

Other racers include Mitsubishi engineer Jackie Chan, teamed with a giant behind the wheel in a car—a Mitsubishi Starion—able to go under water. In a red Lamborghini (white at first) with "two great-looking chicks in it" (as the cops chasing them continually say) is the duo of Jill Rivers and Marcie Thatcher. Another team in a Cadillac Fleetwood is accompanied by an orangutan, who has a penchant for destructive behavior and giving elderly ladies the middle finger and appears to be the vehicle's chauffeur. They are pulled over at one point by two California Highway Patrol officers.

J.J. and Victor stop along the way to help a stranded soldier, Homer Lyle. They also get much better acquainted with their passengers, Betty and Veronica, who change into something a little more comfortable.

Don Don's enforcers continue to blunder along the way, with disastrous results.

After Don Don's gang capture the Sheik, the racers band together to invade Don Don's "Pinto Ranch". J.J., Victor, and Fenderbaum infiltrate it in drag, dressed as belly dancers. Others barrel in by car and rescue the Sheik, who is reluctant to leave, since he has his pick of women there. The three "dancers" and Blake go to their Leader to seek help, only to have him jump into the race himself.

In the end, the Sheik bankrolls Don Don's Ranch and then declares that he is upping the stakes to $2 million for the winner. All jump into their automobiles and make a dash for the finish line, avoiding traffic patrollers on the way.

The Sheik, as it turns out, loses yet again, this time blaming the doctor who rode with him for injecting him with an unknown substance. He convinces his father that he will win the return-trip race, having hired the winner of this one. It turns out to be the orangutan, who kisses the startled King on the lips.

Cast 

 Burt Reynolds as J.J. McClure
 Dom DeLuise as Victor Prinzi/Captain Chaos (DeLuise also appears uncredited as Don Canneloni)
 Dean Martin as Jamie Blake
 Sammy Davis Jr. as Morris Fenderbaum
 Jamie Farr as Sheik Abdul ben Falafel
 Ricardo Montalbán as King Abdul ben Falafel
 Telly Savalas as Hymie Kaplan
 Marilu Henner as Betty
 Shirley MacLaine as Veronica
 Susan Anton as Jill Rivers ("Lamborghini Babe #1", originally played by Tara Buckman)
 Catherine Bach as Marcie Thatcher ("Lamborghini Babe #2", originally played by Adrienne Barbeau)
 Foster Brooks, Sid Caesar and Louis Nye as the fishermen in the rowboat
 Jackie Chan as Jackie Chan, Mitsubishi engineer
 Richard Kiel as Arnold, Jackie's driver
 Tim Conway and Don Knotts as California Highway Patrol officers who pull over the driving monkey
 Mel Tillis as Mel (back from the first film) and Tony Danza as Tony, the limo drivers with the orangutan
 Manis as the Orangutan 'Limo driver'. 
 Jack Elam as Doctor Nikolas Van Helsing
 Charles Nelson Reilly as Don Don Canneloni
 Michael V. Gazzo as Sonny, Don Don's Henchman
 Alex Rocco as Tony, Don Don's Henchman
 Henry Silva as Slim, Don Don's Henchman
 Abe Vigoda as Caesar, Don Don's Henchman
 Jim Nabors as Private Homer Lyle, a parody of his popular character, Gomer Pyle
 Molly Picon reprises her role of Mrs. Goldfarb, Seymour's mother. In this film, Cannonballers drive into her house
 Frank Sinatra as himself
 Joe Theismann as Mack, the truck driver who helps out Jill and Marcie
 Shawn Weatherly as the girl in Jamie Blake's bed
 Linda Lei as the Beautiful Girl, Japanese-American girl that Jackie talks to after biker fight
 Kai Joseph Wong as a Japanese businessman
 Dale Ishimoto as a Japanese father, during biker fight scene
 Arte Johnson as an "ace" pilot Victor who says is "from World War 2" and speaks with a telltale German accent
 Fred Dryer as a California Highway Patrol sergeant (listed in the opening credits as "Fred Dreyer")
 Chris Lemmon as a young California Highway Patrol officer
 George Lindsey as Uncle Cal
 Doug McClure as The Sheik's servant, an out-of-work actor who has not had a series in nine years
 Jilly Rizzo as Jilly
 Dub Taylor as a sheriff
 Harry Gant as a mob henchman 

 Director Hal Needham appears uncredited as a Porsche 928 driver in a cowboy hat, whose car is crushed flat in the movie by the monster truck, Bigfoot (driven by owner/creator Bob Chandler)
 Producer Albert Ruddy appears in the satirical Mafioso subplot with Rocco and Vigoda, both of which had also appeared in The Godfather which Ruddy produced.

Production
Jaclyn Smith was originally meant to be the female lead but dropped out. Needham said that Smith was worried about his improvisational style: "I think she was scared to death to be up there against Burt and Dom. I don't want someone on the set that's gonna be that scared. So we went somewhere else". She was replaced by Shirley Maclaine.

Frank Sinatra agreed to do a cameo at the suggestion of Davis and Martin. Needham wrote three versions of the script for him: one where he would work a week, two days, or a day. He picked the latter. He was paid $30,000 which he donated to charity. It was the first film he had made in three years and the first time he had reunited with Rat Pack members professionally or personally in three years. Needham says he turned up half an hour early and did his scene with minimal fuss.

Part of the film was shot near Tucson, Arizona. To show the momentum of the race, the producers commissioned Ralph Bakshi to animate a cartoon sequence for the finale.

Reception

Box office
According to one review of the film, Cannonball Run II still turned a healthy profit, and the reviewer attributed the film's financial success to preselling.

The film enjoyed more success overseas. In Japan, it was the second-highest-grossing foreign film of 1984 (along with Jackie Chan's Project A at number three), grossing . In Germany (where it was the year's seventh highest-grossing film) and France, the film drew 3,748,167 box-office admissions.

Critical reception
Cannonball Run II was met with harsher reviews than was its predecessor, with a 13% approval rating on Rotten Tomatoes based on reviews from 16 critics. Roger Ebert awarded the film one half star out of four, calling it "one of the laziest insults to the intelligence of moviegoers that I can remember. Sheer arrogance made this picture". Ebert's At the Movies cohost Gene Siskel was even harsher, awarding it zero stars out of four, referring to it as "worthless" and referring to it as "a total ripoff, a deceptive film that gives movies a bad name" in his At the Movies review. Siskel named it his least-favorite film that he had seen during his time doing At the Movies with Ebert. Both critics expressed bewilderment by Burt Reynolds' career choices, declaring that he was wasting his considerable talent and noting that Reynolds' huge fan base did not like the film (nor the recent Stroker Ace) and would stop going to see his movies if he continued to make such terrible films.

The film received eight Golden Raspberry Award nominations at the 1984 Golden Raspberry Awards, including Worst Picture, Worst Actor and Worst Actress.

See also
 Speed Zone, also known as Cannonball Fever and Cannonball Run III
 Cannonball Baker Sea-To-Shining-Sea Memorial Trophy Dash''

References

External links

 
 
 
 
 Movie stills

1984 films
1980s comedy road movies
American comedy road movies
American sequel films
Hong Kong action comedy films
1980s English-language films
American auto racing films
Films directed by Hal Needham
Warner Bros. films
Films shot in Tucson, Arizona
Films shot in Connecticut
Films shot in Nevada
Films shot in California
Golden Harvest films
1984 comedy films
1980s American films